We're Here Because We're Here is the eighth album by the British rock band Anathema. It was released on 31 May 2010. The working title of the album was Horizons. The album was mixed by Steven Wilson of Porcupine Tree.

Background
Ville Valo of the band HIM recorded backing vocals for the song "Angels Walk Among Us". The title of the album is taken from a song of the same name that was sung in the Allied trenches of World War I to the tune of "Auld Lang Syne".

It is the last album to feature keyboardist Les Smith, as well as the first to feature vocalist Lee Douglas as an official band member.

Reception

Response from the critics was universally positive. The album was awarded "Prog Album of the Year" by Classic Rock magazine, who described it as "a flawless, life-affirming comeback and a gold-plated contender for album of the year".

Track listing
All songs written by Daniel Cavanagh, except where noted.

Special Edition Bonus DVD–Audio
 The Entire Album in lossless 24/48 5.1 Surround and Stereo

Singles
 Dreaming Light Digital Single/EP 
 "Dreaming Light"	
 "Universal" (Engineers Remix)	
 "Dreaming Light" (Video)

 Everything Digital Single
 Everything

Personnel
 Vincent Cavanagh — vocals, guitar
 Daniel Cavanagh — guitar, piano, keyboards, vocals
 Jamie Cavanagh — bass guitar
 John Douglas — percussion, drums, keyboards, guitars
 Lee Douglas — vocals
 Les Smith — keyboards

Charts

References

External links

 

2010 albums
Anathema (band) albums
Kscope albums